Jimmy Worthington (21 January 1904 – 24 August 1976) was a British swimmer. He competed in the men's 100 metre backstroke event at the 1924 Summer Olympics.

References

External links
 

1904 births
1976 deaths
British male swimmers
Olympic swimmers of Great Britain
Swimmers at the 1924 Summer Olympics
Place of birth missing
British male backstroke swimmers